Contact Comics is an American comic book series published during what is known as the Golden Age of Comic Books by Aviation Press. All of the stories printed in Contact Comics dealt with modern aviation.

Regular features included Golden Eagle, Blazing Venus, and Tommy Tomahawk. Contributors to the title included Rudy Palais, Alvin Hollingsworth, Nina Albright, Carmine Infantino, Harvey Kurtzman, George Appel, Robert Sale (aka Bob Q. Siege), and Paul Parker. Covers were by L.B. Cole.

A total of twelve issues were published.

Publication History
Contact Comics was first issued by Aviation Press in July 1944 .
Regular features in Contact Comics were : Blazing Venus, Tommy Tomahawk and Golden Eagle .

References

 
 

Comics magazines published in the United States
Golden Age comics titles
1944 comics debuts
1946 comics endings
Aviation comics
Magazines established in 1944
Magazines disestablished in 1946